"Here I Go Again" is a song recorded by Swedish singer-songwriter E-Type. It was released in November 1998 as the second single from his third album, Last Man Standing and was a hit in several countries, particularly in Sweden and Finland where it reached number-one. Chorus vocals are performed by Nana Hedin.

Critical reception
Pan-European magazine Music & Media wrote, "Packing several hooks and a peppy eurobeat, the track is lushly produced with more than a hint of Jim Steinman's "more is better" approach. Pure pop, very Scandi and very programmable."

Music video
The accompanying music video followed up the theme from "Angels Crying" by featuring an homage to horror movies. It was directed by Mikeodelica. While the video for "Angels Crying" was similar to Friday the 13th, "Here I Go Again" had the same plot as Poltergeist.

Track listings
 CD maxi	
 "Here I Go Again" (radio version) — 3:55
 "Here I Go Again" (richi's extended version) — 7:05
 "Here I Go Again" (disco 2000 remix) — 4:54
 "Here I Go Again" (extended version) — 7:36

Charts and certifications

Weekly charts

Year-end charts

Certifications

References

1998 singles
1998 songs
E-Type (musician) songs
Nana Hedin songs
Number-one singles in Finland
Number-one singles in Sweden
Song recordings produced by Max Martin
English-language Swedish songs